The 1971 Atlanta Braves season was the sixth season in Atlanta along with the 101st season as a franchise overall.

Offseason 
 November 30, 1970: Hal Breeden was traded by the Braves to the Chicago Cubs for Hoyt Wilhelm.
 December 2, 1970: Bob Tillman was traded by the Braves to the Milwaukee Brewers for Hank Allen, John Ryan (minors) and Paul Click (minors).
 December 22, 1970: Don Cardwell was released by the Braves.

Regular season

Season standings

Record vs. opponents

Notable transactions 
 April 1971: Hank Allen was released by the Braves.
 April 16, 1971: Luis Tiant was signed as a free agent by the Braves.
 May 15, 1971: Luis Tiant was released by the Braves.
 June 2, 1971: Clete Boyer was released by the Braves.
 June 8, 1971: 1971 Major League Baseball draft
Biff Pocoroba was drafted by the Braves in the 17th round.
Mike Beard was drafted by the Braves in the 1st round (18th pick) of the secondary phase.
 June 29, 1971: Hoyt Wilhelm was released by the Braves.

Roster

Player stats

Batting

Starters by position 
Note: Pos = Position; G = Games played; AB = At bats; H = Hits; Avg. = Batting average; HR = Home runs; RBI = Runs batted in

Other batters 
Note: G = Games played; AB = At bats; H = Hits; Avg. = Batting average; HR = Home runs; RBI = Runs batted in

Pitching

Starting pitchers 
Note: G = Games pitched; IP = Innings pitched; W = Wins; L = Losses; ERA = Earned run average; SO = Strikeouts

Other pitchers 
Note: G = Games pitched; IP = Innings pitched; W = Wins; L = Losses; ERA = Earned run average; SO = Strikeouts

Relief pitchers 
Note: G = Games pitched; W = Wins; L = Losses; SV = Saves; ERA = Earned run average; SO = Strikeouts

Farm system 

LEAGUE CHAMPIONS: Greenwood

Notes

References 

1971 Atlanta Braves season at Baseball Reference

Atlanta Braves seasons
Atlanta Braves season
Atlanta